The Nanaimo Timbermen are a Senior A box lacrosse club, based in Nanaimo, British Columbia. The team competes in the 7-team Western Lacrosse Association (WLA).

Their short history has not been a pleasant one, placing sixth place in their first two seasons. In 2007, the Timbermen finished in fifth place, missing the playoffs by a tie-breaker with the Maple Ridge Burrards. In the 2010 season, the Timbermen finished fifth in the league, missing the playoffs by a three-way tie-breaker with the Coquitlam Adanacs and Maple Ridge Burrards.   

Unlike their island counterparts, the Victoria Shamrocks, the Timbermen rely on mostly local talent with 9 of their players coming from the Nanaimo area and 19 of their players coming from Vancouver Island.

This team is not related to the similarly named Nanaimo Timbermen that played in the WLA from 1951 to 1961 and also from 1975 to 1981.

All time Record

External links
Nanaimo Timbermen Official Website
Current Roster
Bible of Lacrosse

Sport in Nanaimo
Western Lacrosse Association teams
2005 establishments in British Columbia
Lacrosse clubs established in 2005